The 1947 VPI Gobblers football team was an American football that represented Virginia Polytechnic Institute in the Southern Conference during the 1947 college football season.  In its third season under head coach Jimmy Kitts, the team compiled a 4–5 record (4–3 against conference opponents), finished eighth in the Southern Conference, and as outscored by a total of 191 to 162. The team played its home games at Miles Stadium in Blacksburg, Virginia.

Schedule

1948 NFL draftees
One VPI player was selected in the 1948 NFL Draft, as follows:

Players
The following players were members of the 1947 football team according to the roster published in the 1948 edition of The Bugle, the Virginia Tech yearbook.

References

VPI
Virginia Tech Hokies football seasons
VPI Gobblers football